Simon Gustafson (born 11 January 1995) is a Swedish professional footballer who plays for Häcken as a midfielder.

Career
In July 2015, Gustafson joined Feyenoord on a four-year contract. Feyenoord reportedly paid a £1 million transfer fee for Gustafson, who had made two appearances for the Sweden national team. He was loaned to Roda JC for the remainder of the 2017–18 season on 14 July 2017.

On 16 July 2022, Gustafson returned to Häcken and signed a contract until the end of 2025, reuniting with his twin brother Samuel.

Personal life
He is the twin brother of Samuel Gustafson.

Career statistics

Club

Honours
Feyenoord
 Eredivisie: 2016–17
 KNVB Cup: 2015–16
BK Häcken

 Allsvenskan: 2022

Sweden U21
UEFA European Under-21 Championship: 2015

References

External links
 
 

1995 births
Living people
Association football midfielders
Swedish footballers
Sweden youth international footballers
Sweden under-21 international footballers
Sweden international footballers
BK Häcken players
Feyenoord players
Roda JC Kerkrade players
FC Utrecht players
Allsvenskan players
Eredivisie players
Swedish expatriate footballers
Expatriate footballers in the Netherlands
Swedish expatriate sportspeople in the Netherlands
Swedish twins
Twin sportspeople